The girls' halfpipe event at the 2016 Winter Youth Olympics took place on 14 February at the Hafjell Freepark.

Results
The final was started at 9:40.

References

External links
olympedia.org

Snowboarding at the 2016 Winter Youth Olympics